John Grant Chapman (July 5, 1798 – December 10, 1856) was an American politician.

Chapman was born in La Plata, Maryland, and was tutored at home.  He attended a college in Pennsylvania in 1812 and 1813, and graduated from Yale College in 1817.  He studied law, was admitted to the bar in 1819, and commenced practice at Port Tobacco, Maryland.  He also held an interest in agricultural pursuits.

Chapman served as a member of the Maryland House of Delegates from 1824 to 1832 and from 1843 to 1844, serving as Speaker of the House from 1826 to 1829 and again in 1844.  He served as a member of the Maryland State Senate from 1832 to 1836, and served as President of the Senate from 1833 to 1836.  He also served in the State militia, and was an unsuccessful candidate for Governor of Maryland in 1844.

In 1844 and 1846, Chapman was elected as a Whig to the Twenty-ninth and Thirtieth Congresses, serving from March 4, 1845 to March 3, 1849.  During the Thirtieth Congress, he served as chairman of the Committee on the District of Columbia.

After his tenure in Congress, Chapman resumed the practice of law at Port Tobacco, and served as president of the State constitutional convention in 1851.  Chapman died at his sister’s estate, "Waverly", on the Wicomico River in Charles County, Maryland, and was initially interred at St. Johns, a family estate.  He was re-interred later in Mount Rest Cemetery of La Plata, Maryland.

Chapman was father of Andrew Grant Chapman, another Maryland Congressman.

References

External links 

 Chapman family papers, at the University of Maryland libraries

1798 births
1856 deaths
People from La Plata, Maryland
Members of the Maryland House of Delegates
Speakers of the Maryland House of Delegates
Maryland state senators
Presidents of the Maryland State Senate
Yale College alumni
Whig Party members of the United States House of Representatives from Maryland
19th-century American politicians